Bachelor of Optometry (abbreviated as B.Optom) is a four-year degree programme in the field of Optometry, awarded upon graduation from an optometry school under a recognised university.  Its curriculum is designed to impart knowledge related to eye and it's connected organs, the correction of refractive errors, and the treatment and management of eye diseases. This degree comprises four years of education including one year of clinical internship at a tertiary eye care center. This degree is the minimum required qualification to be called as an optometrist, and to practice optometry (which includes tasks like prescribing spectacles, contact lenses, eye medicines etc) in several countries of the world.

Countries

The degree is currently awarded in institutions in Australia, Bangladesh, Brazil, India, Nepal, Oman, United Kingdom etc. and various others.

About
B.Optom is a eye specific four year professional degree which covers all aspects of medical and optical management of the eye, except surgery. 
Optometrists generally provide primary care which includes prescription of spectacles or contact lenses to correct refractive error as well as prescription of eye medicines for the treatment of eye diseases.
Optometrists also practice at secondary and tertiary levels of eyecare after doing post graduation (M.OPTOM) and fellowships in certain specialities like Comprehensive Optometry, Contact Lenses, Orthoptics and Vision Therapy, Geriatrics, Paediatrics, Low Vision, Ocularistry etc.

References

Optometry, Bachelor of
Optometry